Raça Sport Brazil, also called Raça SB, is a Brazilian football club in the city of Goiânia, in the state of Goiás.

History
Founded on November 15, 1999, the club competed only in the federation's amateur championships.  And in 2014 the club's directors tried to enroll the team in third division Campeonato Goiano, but the application was not accepted by the federation. 

The club played its first professional football championship in 2016 when it debuted in the third division of Campeonato Goiano.

Achievements 
Campeonato Goiano (Third Division)
 4th place (1): 2016 
 8th place (1): 2017 
 7th place (1): 2018 
 10th Place (1): 2019

Players

Squad 2019

Squad 2018

Squad 2017

 (C)

References 

Football clubs in Goiânia